Giovanni Scanu  (born 3 May 1975) is an Italian football manager.

Born in Nuoro, Italy, Scanu was assistant manager of various clubs in the Serie D and Lega Pro Seconda Divisione from 2006 to 2011, when he started his head coaching career at hometown club Nuorese Calcio in the Eccellenza. From 2012 onwards, Scanu coached in various countries abroad, namely FK Tauras Tauragė and FK Nevezis in Lithuania, Kaduna United in Nigeria, Coritiba de Sergipe in Brazil, FC Tatabánya in Hungary, Brothers Union in Bangladesh, FC Zimbru Chisinau in Moldova, and Kilimani City in Tanzania.

Managerial career
Scanu was born in Nuoro, Italy. His coaching career began in the Santu Pedru football school, where he stayed for three years. Afterwards, he moved to lead Atletico Nuoro for two years. In 2003 he moved to Loculese, followed by Tuttavista and then a return to Atletico Nuoro.

He became the assistant manager under Ninni Corda at Tempio in the Serie D, where he won the 2006–07 Serie D – Girone B title. The next year, he and Corda moved to Como, where they again won the Serie D – Girone B, as well as the Coppa Italia Serie D. He then moved on to Alghero in the Lega Pro Seconda Divisione in 2008–09 as an assistant, remaining for two years. He then moved to Tavolara in Serie D, again as an assistant. 

In 2011, he started as head coach, in his hometown with Eccellenza club Nuorese Calcio, but did not remain there for long before resigning the position in December of 2011. In 2012, he moved to Lithuanian club FK Tauras Tauragė in the top tier A Lyga, bringing several Italian players with him. Then, in 2013, he moved to Kaduna United in the Nigerian Premier League. The following year, in 2014, he returned to Lithuania, again at FK Tauras in the second tier I Lyga, following their relegation the prior season. In 2015, he moved to Brazil, becoming the coach of Coritiba de Sergipe. He moved to Hungarian side FC Tatabánya of the third tier Nemzeti Bajnokság III for the 2016–17 season, until the team was disqualified. In July 2017, he moved to Bangladesh (Asia now being his fourth different continent), in the Bangladesh Premier League with Brothers Union. A month later, Brothers replaced him after the fourth match of the season, after Scanu went on a lengthy leave of absence, due to health concerns of his mother. In 2018–19, he returned to Lithuania with FK Nevezis in the I Lyga. In 2020, he moved to Moldova with FC Zimbru Chisinau in the top tier Divizia Națională. He remained coach until the COVID-19 pandemic interrupted the season and then he and the club parted ways.

In 2021, he became the manager of Kilimani City FC in the second-tier Tanzanian First Division League initially signing a short three-month contract until the end of the season, but remained with the club beyond that as head coach. While there, he turned down the opportunity to become the Zanzibar national team coach, preferring to remain a coach at club level.

Honours 
as Assistant manager

Tempio
 Serie D Girone B: 2006–07

Como
 Serie D Girone B: 2007–08
 Coppa Italia Serie D: 2007–08

References

External links

 

1975 births
Living people
People from Nuoro
Italian football managers
Eccellenza managers
Nuorese Calcio managers
Italian expatriate football managers
Expatriate football managers in Lithuania
Italian expatriate sportspeople in Lithuania
A Lyga managers
FK Tauras Tauragė managers
Expatriate football managers in Nigeria
Italian expatriate sportspeople in Nigeria
Nigeria Professional Football League managers
I Lyga managers
Expatriate football managers in Brazil
Italian expatriate sportspeople in Brazil
Expatriate football managers in Hungary
Italian expatriate sportspeople in Hungary
Nemzeti Bajnokság III managers
FC Tatabánya managers
Expatriate football managers in Bangladesh
Italian expatriate sportspeople in Bangladesh
Bangladesh Football Premier League managers
Brothers Union managers
FK Nevėžis managers
Expatriate football managers in Moldova
Italian expatriate sportspeople in Moldova
Moldovan Super Liga managers
FC Zimbru Chișinău managers
Sportspeople from Sardinia